Pál Turán (18 August 1910 – 26 September 1976) also known as Paul Turán, was a Hungarian mathematician who worked primarily in extremal combinatorics. He had a long collaboration with fellow Hungarian mathematician Paul Erdős, lasting 46 years and resulting in 28 joint papers.

Life and education
Turán was born into a Jewish family in Budapest on 18 August 1910.At the same period of time, Turán and Erdős were famous answerers in the journal KöMaL. He received a teaching degree at the University of Budapest in 1933 and the PhD degree under Lipót Fejér in 1935 at Eötvös Loránd University.

As a Jew, he fell victim to numerus clausus, and could not get a university job for several years. He was sent to labour service at various times from 1940-44. He is said to have been recognized and perhaps protected by a fascist guard, who, as a mathematics student, had admired Turán's work.

Turán became associate professor at the University of Budapest in 1945 and full professor in 1949. Turán married twice. He married Edit (Klein) Kóbor in 1939; they had one son, Róbert. His second marriage was to Vera Sós, a mathematician, in 1952; they had two children, György and Tamás.

Death
Turán died in Budapest on 26 September 1976 of leukemia, aged 66.

Work
Turán worked primarily in number theory, but also did much work in analysis and graph theory.

Number theory
Halász says "Its true significance lies in the fact that it was the starting point of probabilistic number theory". The Turán–Kubilius inequality is a generalization of this work. 

Turán was very interested in the distribution of primes in arithmetic progressions, and he coined the term "prime number race" for irregularities in the distribution of prime numbers among residue classes. With his coauthor Knapowski he proved results concerning Chebyshev's bias. The Erdős–Turán conjecture makes a statement about primes in arithmetic progression. Much of Turán's number theory work dealt with the Riemann hypothesis and he developed the power sum method (see below) to help with this. Erdős said "Turán was an 'unbeliever,' in fact, a 'pagan': he did not believe in the truth of Riemann's hypothesis."

Analysis
Much of Turán's work in analysis was tied to his number theory work. Outside of this he proved Turán's inequalities relating the values of the Legendre polynomials for different indices, and, together with Paul Erdős, the Erdős–Turán equidistribution inequality.

Graph theory
Erdős wrote of Turán, "In 1940–1941 he created the area of extremal problems in graph theory which is now one of the fastest-growing subjects in combinatorics." The field is known more briefly today as extremal graph theory. Turán's best-known result in this area is Turán's graph theorem, that gives an upper bound on the number of edges in a graph that does not contain the complete graph Kr as a subgraph. He invented the Turán graph, a generalization of the complete bipartite graph, to prove his theorem. He is also known for the Kővári–Sós–Turán theorem bounding the number of edges that can exist in a bipartite graph with certain forbidden subgraphs, and for raising Turán's brick factory problem, namely of determining the crossing number of a complete bipartite graph.

Power sum method
Turán developed the power sum method to work on the Riemann hypothesis. The method deals with inequalities giving lower bounds for sums of the form
 hence the name "power sum".

Aside from its applications in analytic number theory, it has been used in complex analysis, numerical analysis, differential equations, transcendental number theory, and estimating the number of zeroes of a function in a disk.

Publications
 
  Deals with the power sum method.

Honors
 Hungarian Academy of Sciences elected corresponding member in 1948 and ordinary member in 1953
 Kossuth Prize in 1948 and 1952
 Tibor Szele Prize of János Bolyai Mathematical Society 1975

Notes

External links

 Paul Turán memorial lectures at the Rényi Institute

1910 births
1976 deaths
20th-century Hungarian mathematicians
Austro-Hungarian mathematicians
Graph theorists
Number theorists
Members of the Hungarian Academy of Sciences
Hungarian Jews
Deaths from leukemia
Deaths from cancer in Hungary
Eötvös Loránd University alumni
Hungarian World War II forced labourers